Sarkegad is a rural municipality located in Humla District of Karnali Province of Nepal.

The rural municipality is divided into total 8 wards and the headquarters of the rural municipality is situated at Saya.

Demographics
At the time of the 2011 Nepal census, 99.7% of the population in Sarkegad Rural Municipality spoke Nepali and 0.1% Tamang as their first language; 0.2% spoke other languages.

In terms of ethnicity/caste, 52.9% were Chhetri, 22.9% Thakuri, 7.8% Kami, 5.1% Hill Brahmin, 3.7% Byasi/Sauka, 3.4% Sarki, 2.8% Damai/Dholi, 1.2% Badi and 0.2% others.

In terms of religion, 96.0% were Hindu, 3.8% Buddhist and 0.2% Christian.

References

External links
 Official website

Populated places in Humla District
Rural municipalities in Karnali Province
Rural municipalities of Nepal established in 2017